D'Iberville, after Pierre Le Moyne d'Iberville, may refer to the following:

D'Iberville, Mississippi
D'Iberville High School, the town's local high school
D'Iberville (Montreal Metro), a station on the Montreal Metro
D'Iberville (TV series), a Canadian television series

Ships
French cruiser D'Iberville, a torpedo cruiser launched in 1893
French aviso D'Iberville, an aviso launched in 1935
CCGS D'Iberville, a Canadian Coast Guard icebreaker